Aimele, or Kware, is a Papuan language of Papua New Guinea.

References

Further reading

External links 
An archive of Eibela language materials from the Bosavi region
OLAC resources in and about the Aimele language

Bosavi languages
Languages of Southern Highlands Province
Languages of Western Province (Papua New Guinea)